Emmanuel Breuillard (born 25 June 1977) is a French mathematician. He was the Sadleirian Professor of Pure Mathematics in the
Department of Pure Mathematics and Mathematical Statistics (DPMMS) at the University of Cambridge, and is now Professor of Pure Mathematics at the Mathematical Institute, University of Oxford as of January 1, 2022. He had previously been professor at Paris-Sud 11 University.

In 2012, he won an EMS Prize for his contributions to combinatorics and other fields. His area of research has been in group theoretic aspects of geometry, number theory and combinatorics. In 2014 he was an invited speaker at the International Congress of Mathematicians in Seoul.

References

External links
Website at the University of Cambridge
Website at Paris-Sud 11 University

1977 births
Living people
20th-century French mathematicians
21st-century French mathematicians
École Normale Supérieure alumni
Yale University alumni
Academic staff of Paris-Sud University
International Mathematical Olympiad participants
Fellows of Worcester College, Oxford
Sadleirian Professors of Pure Mathematics